Major General Christopher Michael Maltby,  (13 January 1891 – 6 September 1980) was a senior officer in the British Indian Army who served as Commander of British Troops in Hong Kong in 1941 before the Japanese invasion of Hong Kong, after which he became a prisoner of war.

Military career
Educated at Bedford School, Maltby attended the Royal Military Academy, Woolwich, from where he was commissioned into the 9th Jat Regiment of the Indian Army in 1910. In the years leading to war, he served in the Persian Gulf.

He saw service in the First World War, mainly on the Western Front, where, in addition to being wounded, he was awarded the Military Cross and was thrice mentioned in dispatches.

With the war over, he then went to the Staff College in Quetta in 1923. He served on the North West Frontier in India and then became a general staff officer at Army Headquarters in India in 1925. He went on to the Staff College at Andover in 1927 and then was appointed Deputy Assistant Adjutant General at Army Headquarters in India in 1930. He returned to the North West Frontier in India in 1937 and then became an instructor at the Staff College at Quetta in 1938 before being appointed a general staff officer in Baluchistan District in India in 1939.

He served in the Second World War initially as Commander of 3rd Jhelum Brigade, then as Commander of the Calcutta Brigade, and finally as Commander of 19th Indian Infantry Brigade in Deccan District in India.

He was made Commander of British Troops in China in August 1941. He was unimpressed when he assumed the post on 19 July 1941. In his first letter to his wife upon arrival, he wrote, "the Governor is a very sick man and only wants to go quietly, and there is still a tremendous lot to be done on the civil defence side, so I am afraid my start must be demanding things. Why must one always have to fight the civil administration?" Meanwhile, the Hong Kong sappers impressed Maltby during the ceremony on 1 August so much that he proposed to the War Office to raise a ‘Chinese infantry battalion’ with the prospect of ‘further expansion’ on 8 August. The War Office approved the proposal on 24 August; it was the beginning of the first locally raised Hong Kong infantry unit in the British Army, the Hong Kong Chinese Regiment. 

He initially established a 10-mile line of defence known as Gin Drinkers Line across the Southern part of the mainland but was rapidly forced to withdraw his troops back to Hong Kong Island. General Takashi Sakai began a bombardment of the Island and, after a brief counter-attack by British Troops which commenced on 19 December 1941, Maltby surrendered to the Japanese at Queen's Pier on 25 December 1941. He was a prisoner of war from 1941 to 1945.

Retirement
Reverting to his permanent rank of colonel, Maltby retired on 10 June 1946. He was granted the honorary rank of major-general on 10 June 1946. In 1953, Maltby was granted a commission as a Deputy lieutenant of Somerset, where he spent his remaining years, the last five of them a widower.

References

Bibliography

External links
 British Military History Biographies M
Generals of World War II

1891 births
1980 deaths
Academics of the Staff College, Quetta
Graduates of the Royal Military Academy, Woolwich
Companions of the Order of the Bath
Indian Army personnel of World War I
Indian Army generals of World War II
Recipients of the Military Cross
World War II prisoners of war held by Japan
Battle of Hong Kong
Hong Kong in World War II
People educated at Bedford School
Graduates of the Staff College, Quetta
Deputy Lieutenants of Somerset
Military personnel of British India
British Indian Army generals